Lope Martín was an Afro-Portuguese seafarer who served as the pilot of the patache San Lucas, commanded by Alonso de Arellano, in the Legazpi-Urdaneta voyage to the Philippines. They were the first European explorers to complete a round trip across the Pacific Ocean, sailing from Navidad on the west coast of Mexico in 1564 to the Philippines, and returning to Navidad in 1565. As such, Martin is credited with having opened the Pacific as a viable trading and exploration route.

References

 

Spanish explorers of the Pacific
Portuguese people of African descent
History of Portugal
Exploration of the Pacific Ocean
History of Africa
Spanish explorers of North America
Explorers of Asia